Marc Henri Benoist better known as Marco de Gastyne (born in Paris, France, on 15 July 1889; died in Paris on 8 November 1982) was a French painter, illustrator and later film director of more than fifteen films.

After studying painting, he worked at la Villa Médicis from 1911 to 1913. He also became an illustrator for the French journal La Baïonnette. Then he turned to cinema directing more than a dozen films between 1922 and 1962. His debut film co-directed with Franz Toussaint was Inch'Allah in 1922. His most known film is La Merveilleuse Vie de Jeanne d'Arc which he directed in 1929.

He discovered Dalida and promoted her in his film Le Masque de Toutankhamon in 1954.

Personal life
He was the son of French writer Jules Benoist, better known by his literary name Jules de Gastyne and his brother was the chief designer Guy de Gastyne. In 1914, he married Mary Christian, a lyrical singer, and they had a daughter before divorcing after ten years of marriage. Soon after, he remarried in 1924 with Choura Miléna, an actress in his films who predeceased him.

Filmography

Director

1922: Inch'Allah (co-directed with Franz Toussaint)
1923: À l'horizon du sud (also known as L'Aventure)
1925: La Blessure (also known as Les Ailes brûlées)
 The Lady of Lebanon (1926)
 Madonna of the Sleeping Cars (1927) (co-directed with Maurice Gleize)
 Change of Heart (1928)
 Saint Joan the Maid (1929) (also known as La Merveilleuse vie de Jeanne d'Arc, fille de Lorraine)
1930: Une belle garce
1932: Une fine partie
1932: Le Chimpanzé
1932: Claudie dompteuse (also known as Mademoiselle Orphée)
 The Wandering Beast (1932)
 Rothchild (1934)
1935: Vas-y, tue-moi!
1937: La Reine des resquilleuses
1940: Une idée à l'eau (also known as L'Irrésistible Rebelle in a rerelease)
1950: Bistro
1955: Le Masque de Toutankhamon (also known as Le Trésor des pharaons)
1962: Trique, gamin de Paris
1964: Douchka

Screenwriter

1923: À l'horizon du sud (also known as L'Aventure)
1927: La Madone des sleepings
1950: Bistro
1962: Trique, gamin de Paris
1964: Douchka

See also

 List of French film directors
 List of French painters
 List of French writers
 List of illustrators

External links

1889 births
1982 deaths
19th-century French writers
19th-century French painters
French male painters
20th-century French non-fiction writers
20th-century French painters
20th-century French male artists
Painters from Paris
French film directors
French illustrators
French male screenwriters
20th-century French screenwriters
Silent film directors
Writers from Paris
19th-century French male writers
20th-century French male writers
19th-century French male artists